Events in the year 1936 in Brazil.

Incumbents

Federal government 
President: Getúlio Vargas

Governors 
 Alagoas: Osman Laurel
 Amazonas: Álvaro Botelho Maia 
 Bahia: Juracy Magalhães
 Ceará: Francisco de Meneses Pimentel
 Espírito Santo: João Punaro Bley
 Goiás: Pedro Ludovico Teixeira
 Maranhão:
 Mato Grosso: Mário Correia da Costa
 Minas Gerais: Benedito Valadares Ribeiro
 Pará: José Carneiro da Gama Malcher
 Paraíba: Argemiro de Figueiredo 
 Paraná: Manuel Ribas
 Pernambuco: Carlos de Lima Cavalcanti
 Piauí: Leônidas Melo 
 Rio Grande do Norte: Rafael Fernandes Gurjão
 Rio Grande do Sul: José Antônio Flores da Cunha
 Santa Catarina: Nereu Ramos
 São Paulo: Armando de Sales Oliveira (till 29 December); Henrique Smith Baima (from 29 December)
 Sergipe: Erônides de Carvalho

Vice governors 
 Rio Grande do Norte: no vice governor
 São Paulo: no vice governor

Events 
15 January – Farroupilha Revolution centennial fair closes.
16 April – Pedro Calmon is elected to the Academia Brasileira de Letras.
16 October – President Vargas  signed the decree, which gives the name of the aviator Alberto Santos Dumont Airport located in Ponta do Calabouço, in the city of Rio de Janeiro, currently named Santos Dumont Airport, Brazil's first civilian airport.

Arts and culture

Films 
Noites Cariocas, directed and written by Enrique Cadícamo and featuring Grande Otelo.

Births 
13 January – Renato Aragão ("Didi"), actor and comedian
19 January – Carlos Mário da Silva Velloso, president of the Supreme Federal Tribunal 1999–2001.
28 January – Waldyr Boccardo, basketball player (died 2018)
13 March – Carlos Alberto de Nóbrega, actor, comedian and humorist.
12 March – José Mojica Marins ("Coffin Joe"), filmmaker, actor, composer, screenwriter, and television horror host (died 2020)
26 March – Éder Jofre, architect and boxer
24 April – Esther Pillar Grossi, educator and politician
23 May – Wadih Mutran, politician
22 June – Hermeto Pascoal, composer and multi-instrumentalist
4 August – Joaquim Roriz, politician (died 2018)
4 August – Alfredo Bosi, historian and literary critic (died 2021)

Deaths 
date unknown
:pt:Geminiano Lira Castro, politician (born 1863)
:pt:Aarão Reis, engineer (born 1853)

References

See also 
1936 in Brazilian football
List of Brazilian films of 1936

 
1930s in Brazil
Years of the 20th century in Brazil
Brazil
Brazil